Plievo (Phileqongiy-Yurt) is a rural locality (a selo) in Nazranovsky District of the Republic of Ingushetia, Russia. It forms the municipality of the rural settlement of Plievo as the only settlement in its composition.

Geography 

To the south and east of the village is the federal highway "Kavkaz". The railway line of the North Caucasian Railway (section  - ) passes through the village itself and the Plievo station operates.

The nearest settlements are: in the northeast — the city of Karabulak, in the east — the village of Yandare, in the south — the village of Gazi-Yurt, in the southwest — the village of Barsuki and in the northwest - the villages of Upper Achaluki and Middle Achaluki.

History 
On the territory of the rural settlement of Plievo, to the north of the village itself, there is a historical monument mausoleum "", which dates back to 1405–1406.

According to official data, the village of Plievo was founded in 1781 (although a later date, 1836, is also found in scientific works). The first settlers were representatives of the Pliev taïp, which is also the reason for the name of the village (Phileqongiy-Yurt literally means, according to some sources, “the village of the sons of Pkhyile”, that is, "the village of the Plievs").

Characteristics of the village (village "Пліева") as of 1874: "near Sunzha, on the Grozny postal road", 247 houses, 1315 inhabitants (645 males and 670 females), Ingush (Sunni Muslims) live.

As of 1925, the village of Plievo was the center of the village council of the Nazranovsky district of the Ingush Autonomous Oblast of the North Caucasus Krai, it consisted of 573 households, 2668 people lived in it (1351 males and 1317 females). In the village there was a school of the first stage, 8 mills, which at that time were classified as small industrial enterprises, 2 state filling points and 2 party organizations.

In 1944, in connection with the deportation of Chechens and Ingush and the abolition of the Chechen-Ingush ASSR, the village of Plievo was transferred to the North Ossetian ASSR and renamed Akhsar (translated from Ossetian — "valor", "heroism"). After the restoration of the Chechen-Ingush ASSR in 1958, the village was returned to its historical name - Plievo.

In the village itself, on that date, 5812 people of the present population lived.

In 1995, Plievo was abolished and included in the city of Nazran as one of the administrative districts. In 2009, on the basis of the abolished Plievsky administrative district, withdrawn from the city, the village of Plievo was recreated and a municipal formation was formed on its basis with the status of a rural settlement as part of the	Nazranovsky District.

References

Bibliography 
 
 

Rural localities in Ingushetia